Behnam Afas  (born 17 July 1934) is an Iraqi-New Zealander author and researcher. His studies are mostly in the role of the Christian scholars and missionaries, their effect on the renaissance of Iraq during the 19th century and the early 20th century. His work is very well respected from all ethnic and religious groups of Iraq.

Biography
Behnam Fadheel Hanna Afas was born in the city of Mosul (Ninevah) in the northern part of Mesopotamia-Iraq. He is the second of six children of a religious Syriac-Catholic family. His father Fadheel Afas was a merchant in Mosul (Ninevah). The family name came from processing the Gall Nuts and extracting the juice to tan the leather.

Afas finished his secondary school in Mosul where he developed a passion for literature and Arabic language. He completed his secondary school and was one of top three graduates in the national exam. His father sent him to the capital, Baghdad to complete his education where he chose the Higher Education House of Teachers. He received his Bachelor of Arts in literature with honor in 1955. He completed his higher studies in the University of Sorbonne – France and was awarded the D.E.A. on his studies about the role of Iraqi Christians in the renaissance of Iraq during the 19th Century.
Afas taught Arabic language, literature and educating methods in several institutions and schools in Iraq such as; Teachers Training Institute, Baghdad College, Babel College of Theology, Al-Nidhameia high school and Al-Mustansiriya University.
In spite of Afas's passion to New Zealand, he chose to reside in the suburbs of Melbourne, Australia, close to his eldest son Joshua, youngest daughter Rawa, and middle son Jesse living in North America.

On 18 June 2015, he was awarded Al Onka al Thahabia al Dawalia.
حصل على جائزة " العنيقاء الذهبية الدولية " في حزيران 2015 ، وذلك في حفل أدبي أُقيمَ في ملبورن - أستراليا حظرهُ الكثير من المثقفين والأدباء.

His work
Most of Afas's books, researches, lectures and articles prove that the Christian missionaries and scholars in Iraq have given modern Iraq a valuable gift in education, introduction of press and publications leading to considerable effect on the renaissance of Iraq. It is also equivalent to any of its neighboring Arab states in the amount of scholars, researchers and thinkers in the 19th century.

Studies and Published Books
 بغداد ١٩٨٥ اقليميس يوسف داؤد -  رائد من رواد الفكر في العراق ١٨٢٩- ١٨٩٠, دراسة تحليلية published in Arabic (Mgr Clement Yousif Dawood, One of the Pioneers in Intellects).
https://web.archive.org/web/20160304100835/https://dl.dropboxusercontent.com/u/43210294/Clement%20Joseph%20David.pdf
 تاريخ الطباعة والمطبوعات العراقية - Baghdad 1985, published in Arabic, 2-volumes (History of Iraqi Printing and Publications).
 Almaraa w majalat alamal al alafdal laha, published in Arabic (Best Working Fields for Women).
 Christian Heritage in Iraq across the Ages, published in English & Arabic.
 Pioneers of the renaissance in Iraq in the 19th century, study in French & Arabic.
 The Iraqi Christian Heritage in the Renaissance Era, 2010, Melbourne.
https://web.archive.org/web/20160304070814/https://dl.dropboxusercontent.com/u/43210294/Behnam190410Final.pdf
 Memories from the old days (Thikraat min al zaman al baeed), 2011, Melbourne.
 From the depths of memory (Min aamaak al thakira), 2012, Melbourne.
 Of Heritage (Min al turath), 2017, Melbourne.

Well known students
Some of his now famous students are Inaam Kachachi; journalist and author, Zaha Hadid; world-famous architect, and Aziz Al-sayed Jassim; author.

References

 Library of Congress; CT1919.178 D383 1985.
 Library of Congress; MLCMN 95/1854 (Z) FT MEADE.
 Maosooaa Aalam Al Iraq fi Alqorn Alishreen, Ministry of Knowledge - Dr. hameed Almatbaai - 1995, P-32 (Encyclopedia of Famous Names in Iraq in the 20th Century).
 Maosooaa Aalam Al Almousel fi Alqorn Alishreen University of Mousel - Dr Aumar Al Talib - 2007, Page-100 (Encyclopedia of Famous Names in Mousel in the 20th Century).
 Early Arabic Printing: A catalogue of attitudes by Michael W. Albin.
 Al Anqaa Iraqi International organization

External links
 http://www.bakhdida.net/BassimHannaPetros/BehnamAfas.htm
 http://www.azzaman.com/indexq.asp?fname=2008\10\10-22\688.htm&storytitle=
 https://web.archive.org/web/20120304054201/http://www.aawsat.com/details.asp?section=19&issueno= 10999&article=501986&feature=1
 http://www.alarabiya.net/save_print.php?print=1&cont_id=64064
 http://www.kaldu.org/3_chaldean_culture/Mosel17_JosefHody.html
 https://web.archive.org/web/20100620034829/http://ahali-iraq.net/detail.aspx?c=report&id=13059
 https://web.archive.org/web/20190126102536/https://staddai.org.nz/
 http://catalog.loc.gov/cgi-bin/Pwebrecon.cgi?Search_Arg=bahnam+affas&Search_Code=GKEY%5E*&PID=CLwz0Jqjb5YegcmNpwb-S5yfcmPh&SEQ=20100528212454&CNT=100&HIST=1

Living people
1934 births
University of Paris alumni
Academic staff of Al-Mustansiriya University
Iraqi emigrants to New Zealand
Iraqi Christians
Assyrian Iraqi writers
20th-century Iraqi writers
Iraqi expatriates in France
New Zealand expatriates in Australia